Yılan Island or Da Vinci Island (literally "Snake Island") is an Aegean island of Turkey. It was formerly known in Greek as Nisida Erimo (Νησίδα Έρημο).

It is almost at the center of Gülbahçe bay.

References

Aegean islands
Islands of Turkey
Islands of İzmir Province
Urla District
Gulf of İzmir